Mogilev District (Mahilyow Raion, Mogilyovsky Raion, Mogilevsky Raion) is a district (raion) in Mogilev Region, Belarus. The administrative center of the district is the city of Mogilev, which is administratively not a part of the district.

Demographics
As of 2009, the district's population was 43,166.

References

 
Districts of Mogilev Region